Pilot Mountain, a metamorphic quartzite monadnock rising to a peak  above sea level, is one of the most distinctive natural features in the U.S. state of North Carolina. It is a remnant of the ancient chain of Sauratown Mountains. The Saura Native Americans, the region's earliest known inhabitants, called the mountain "Jomeokee", meaning "great guide".

Description 
U.S. Route 52 passes through the town of Pilot Mountain near the mountain, which is about 20 miles northwest of Winston-Salem, and the city of Mount Airy is 14 miles farther north.  

Pilot Mountain has two distinctive features, named Big Pinnacle and Little Pinnacle. Visitors can take a paved road to the park visitor center and campgrounds, then up to a parking lot on the ridge. Trails from there allow access to the main Little Pinnacle Overlook and other viewing stations.

Pilot Mountain is part of Pilot Mountain State Park, which extends to the Yadkin River via a corridor of land, and it is associated with nearby Horne Creek Living Historical Farm. The curved depression between the ridge slope to the Little Pinnacle and then to the round knob of the Big Pinnacle gives the entire mountain an even more distinctive shape from a distance. Other interesting rock formations are to the east at privately held Sauratown Mountain, and the higher complex at Hanging Rock State Park.

In November 2021, a massive 500+ acre wildfire covered Pilot Mountain State Park. This fire enveloped Pilot Mountain as well, with smoke covering the iconic Knob.

Trails
The Jomeokee Trail leads around the base of Big Pinnacle. The Ledge Spring Trail goes past a large picnic area and down along the ridge crest; its lower loop back up past a small perennial spring follows a long cliff that is a popular location for rock climbing. Big Pinnacle is closed to climbing. Other trails include Sassafras Trail and Grindstone Trail, which connects the popular campground to Ledge Spring Trail. Mountain Trail follows up the other side of the ridge to also connect to Ledge Spring Trail. The Grassy Ridge Trail follows along the mountain's base, connecting the lower ends of the Mountain and Grindstone Trails together. The Grassy Ridge Trail also connects to the Corridor Trail, which goes to the park's river section, and it connects to the Mountains-to-Sea and Sauratown Trails, which go to Hanging Rock State Park.

Gallery

References

External links
 Pilot Mountain State Park
 
 ClimbPilotNC climbing guide with text and photos

Mountains of North Carolina
National Natural Landmarks in North Carolina
Landforms of Surry County, North Carolina
Inselbergs of Piedmont (United States)
Yadkin-Pee Dee River Basin